Bernhard Rawitz (23 August 1857, Ostrowo - 28 December 1932) was a German military physician, anatomist and zoologist.

He studied medicine at Kaiser Wilhlem Akademie in Berlin, afterwards serving as a military doctor in Metz (1880–83). He later worked at the zoological stations in Naples (1887–88, 1890) and Rovigno (1892-1898). In the late 19th century he journeyed to northern Norway (Tromsø, Sørvær, Trollfjord, Bear Island), where he performed studies of cetaceans.

In 1889, he qualified as a lecturer of comparative anatomy, and in 1912, was appointed an associate professor to the museum of pathology at the University of Berlin.

Selected writings 
 Die Ranvier'schen Einschnüringen Lautermann'schen Einkerbungen, 1879 (dissertation).
 Die Fußdrüse der Opistobranchier, 1887 - The foot glands of Opisthobranchia.
 Leitfaden für histologische Untersuchungen, 1889 - Guidelines for histological studies.
 Grundriß der Histologie, 1894 - Outline of histology.
 Das Gehörorgan der japanischen Tanzmäuse, 1899 - The hearing organ of the Japanese dancing mouse.
 Ueber den Bau der Cetaceenhaut, 1899 - On the construction of whaleskin
 Lehrbuch der mikroskopischen Technik, 1907 - Textbook of microscopic technique.
 Zeit und Gott : eine kritisch-erkenntnistheoretische Untersuchung auf der Grundlage der physikalischen Relativitätstheorie, (1922, second edition) - Time and God: a critical and epistemological investigation on the basis of the physical theory of relativity.

References 

1857 births
1932 deaths
Academic staff of the Humboldt University of Berlin
People from Ostrów Wielkopolski
German military doctors
German histologists
German anatomists
19th-century German zoologists